Daniil Olegovich Lesovoy (born 12 January 1998) is a Russian professional footballer who plays as a left winger for FC Dynamo Moscow.

Club career
Born in Moscow, Russia, Lesovoy moved to Prague, Czech Republic at early age, and later moved to Kyiv, Ukraine.

He made his debut in the Russian Football National League for FC Zenit-2 St. Petersburg on 18 March 2017 in a game against PFC Spartak Nalchik.

On 28 July 2018, he joined FC Arsenal Tula on loan for the 2018–19 season.

On 4 July 2019, the loan was extended for the 2019–20 season.

On 3 July 2020, Arsenal used their purchase option in the loan contract and signed a 3-year contract with Lesovoy.

On 7 September 2020, he signed a five-year contract with FC Dynamo Moscow. On 7 August 2021, he underwent a knee surgery which left him unable to play until 2022.

International career
After representing Ukraine on under-16 and under-17 level, he debuted for Russia national under-20 football team in September 2018.

In November 2020, he was called up to the Russia national football team for the first time for the games against Moldova, Turkey and Serbia.

On 11 May 2021, he was named as a back-up player for Russia's UEFA Euro 2020 squad.

Career statistics

Club

References

External links
 
 Profile by Russian Football National League
 

1998 births
Footballers from Moscow
Footballers from Prague
Footballers from Kyiv
Living people
Association football forwards
Ukraine youth international footballers
FC Zenit-2 Saint Petersburg players
FC Arsenal Tula players
FC Dynamo Moscow players
Russian Premier League players
Russian First League players
Russian footballers
Ukrainian footballers
Russia youth international footballers
Russia under-21 international footballers
FC Zenit Saint Petersburg players